Dexter Is Dead is the eighth novel written by Jeff Lindsay, and the final book in the Dexter book series, about Dexter Morgan, a vigilante serial killer who almost exclusively targets other serial killers. The book was released on July 7, 2015. A loose adaptation of the novel, serving as a revival of Showtime's Dexter television series, a miniseries entitled Dexter: New Blood, was released from November 7, 2021 to January 9, 2022, with Michael C. Hall reprising his role as the title character.

Plot
After the events of the previous book, Dexter is falsely accused of murdering Rita and molesting Astor. To avoid embarrassment, the Miami-Dade Police Department does all it can to pin the crimes on Dexter, even resorting to falsifying evidence. Deborah decides to cut ties with Dexter, refusing to help him as a way to punish him for his past crimes and also demanding custody of his children. Only Masuoka is working to clear Dexter's name, with no success. Brian bails Dexter out of jail and gets him a lawyer, but is being targeted by a Mexican drug cartel he had previously stolen money from. The cartel tries to kill Dexter multiple times to get to Brian.

Deborah reluctantly contacts Dexter to inform him his kids have been kidnapped, which leads to a fragile reconciliation. Dexter manages to set up a meeting with Detective Anderson and some of Raul's thugs to get him killed, which happens, though not before he manages to kill his attackers, leaving Dexter with no one to interrogate. Eventually they find out that their lawyer was supplying Raul with Dexter's intel, which makes them ambush, kill him and all the cartel's members who followed Frank, save for one, who is taken by the brothers to a secluded warehouse, where he is brutally interrogated to get the kids' location and to satisfy their urges in the process.

Once Dexter's children are located, Brian, Deborah, and Dexter team up, break onto Raul's yacht, and take the kids back. Deborah takes the kids away, but Brian is killed by a bomb he himself planted and Dexter is severely wounded by it followed a gunshot from Raul himself and a stomp onto his wound. After Deborah returns to kill Raul in time, Dexter stays on the yacht to set another bomb so there's no evidence left. Dexter sets it up and goes to leave the ship to be rescued by Deborah in his boat. Gravely weakened from blood loss, Dexter manages to jump off the yacht before it explodes, losing consciousness while sinking into the sea.

In other media

On October 14, 2020, Showtime announced that Dexter would return with a 10-episode limited series exploring a similar premise to Dexter is Dead, starring Michael C. Hall in his original role of Dexter Morgan, with Clyde Phillips returning as showrunner. On November 17, 2020, it was announced Marcos Siega is set to direct six episodes of the limited series as well as executive produce alongside Hall, John Goldwyn, Sara Colleton, Bill Carraro, and Scott Reynolds. Production began in February 2021, with a fall 2021 premiere date. In January 2021, Clancy Brown was cast as Kurt Caldwell, Dexter's main  antagonist and David Magidoff was cast as Teddy. In February 2021, Jamie Chung and Oscar Wahlberg were cast in recurring roles. In June 2021, it was announced that John Lithgow would reprise his role as Arthur Mitchell. In July 2021, it was revealed that Jennifer Carpenter would return as well, with both Lithgow and Carpenter appearing in their characters during flashback scenes. It premiered on November 7, 2021, on Showtime, and concluded on January 9, 2022, with the death of Dexter Morgan.

References

2015 American novels
Dexter (series)
American crime novels
American thriller novels
Doubleday (publisher) books